Edeshko, Yadeshka or Yadzeshka (Belarusian: Ядэшка or Ядзешка; Russian: Едешко) is a gender-neutral Belarusian surname that may refer to
Alyaksandr Yadeshka (born 1993), Belarusian football player
Ivan Edeshko (born 1945), Belarusian basketball player

Belarusian-language surnames